Danielle Bernstein (born May 28, 1992) is an American fashion designer and the founder of the fashion blog and brand WeWoreWhat, which she started when she was a sophomore in college. She has collaborated with numerous brands and has launched her own fashion lines.

Early life and education

Bernstein graduated from William A. Shine Great Neck South High School in 2010, and briefly attended the University of Wisconsin-Madison, where she studied retail, and then transferred to the Fashion Institute of Technology in New York City. She dropped out of college to devote more time to her blog and turn it into a career.

Bernstein is Jewish.

Career
In 2011, Bernstein started WeWoreWhat as a street-style photographer, which soon after transitioned into a personal-style blog, as her Instagram account @WeWoreWhat gained popularity. In 2016, Bernstein launched a line of overalls called Second Skin Overalls, a direct-to-consumer brand. In 2017 at the age of 24, Danielle was placed on the Forbes 30 Under 30 list. In 2017, Bernstein designed a swimwear collaboration with Onia that exclusively sold at Intermix, and was their best-selling suit that summer. The collaboration followed with two others, which the second of the two, an Italy-inspired collection, drove over $3 million in sales. Because of the success of their collaboration, in 2019, she launched her own swimwear line with Onia as her partners. In 2019, Bernstein teamed up with premium denim brand Joe's Jeans to design and release a new style of jeans, called the Danielle Jean. She is the first blogger and influencer to have a product collaboration with the company, and it led to a second collaboration with them that had added styles. In 2020, she made the decision to bring all her brands under one roof with the launch of Shop WeWoreWhat which included swim, denim, overalls, and most recently added active.

In the fall of 2019, Bernstein launched a tech company named Moe Assist, after her longtime intern-turned-assistant Moe Paretti. Moe Assist is the first product-management and payments tool specifically geared for an influencer's workflow, created by an influencer. With the desire to legitimize the industry, Danielle raised $1.2 million in a friends-and-family round of funding

In March 2020, Bernstein launched a namesake brand exclusively at Macy's called Danielle Bernstein. The debut spring collection was all priced under $100 and had a size range of 00–24, becoming Bernstein's first size-inclusive line. Along with the launch, Bernstein had a campaign shoot modeled by real-life followers, featuring women with different body shapes and types so that anyone could see themselves wearing the line. The first collection sold $1 million in the first 2 hours, and $2 million after 24 hours. The Danielle Bernstein summer line launched in June 2020, and featured vintage-inspired dresses and cute sets.

In May 2020, Bernstein published an autobiography, This is Not a Fashion Story: Taking Chances, Breaking Rules, and Being a Boss in the Big City. She wrote about her personal life and her entrepreneurial journey. The book appeared on the New York Times Best Sellers list and was featured on the Business List. However, the New York Times has since placed a "dagger" symbol alongside the book, indicating its listing includes suspicious "bulk purchases."

As a response to the COVID-19 global pandemic, Bernstein launched her charitable arm of WeWoreWhat called WeGaveWhat. The organization began as a platform to support other charities and highlight small businesses that are struggling during the pandemic. To date, she has raised over $200,000 and donated thousands of masks and meals to frontline workers. WeWoreWhat also teamed up with artist Sara Sidari to create a coloring book where 100% of the proceeds went directly to the River Fund, which brought in another $10,000.

Having a passion for design, Bernstein's Soho loft was featured in Architectural Digest in the Fall of 2021, and her first ever WeWoreWhat office space was featured in EST Living.

WeWoreWhat launched it's very own Visa rewards card program, where customers earn cash back on their purchases on the e-commerce site, as well as with all brand partners. The card acts as a debit card and has been in existence since April, 2022.

Controversy
In August 2020, a Brooklyn lingerie store alleged that Bernstein had copied their signature design, which they use on tissue packaging, and used it on swimwear and as print wallpaper.

References

1992 births
American bloggers
American Internet celebrities
American fashion designers
American fashion businesspeople
Living people
Fashion influencers
Fashion Institute of Technology alumni
People from Great Neck, New York
Writers from New York City
American women bloggers
American women fashion designers
21st-century American women